The 2009 Savannah State Tigers baseball team represented Savannah State University in the NCAA Division I baseball season of 2009.  They played their home games at Tiger Field and Grayson Stadium in Savannah, Georgia. The team was coached by Carlton Hardy who was in his fourth season at Savannah State. In 2009, the team led Division I in stolen bases (169 in 207 attempts) and in stolen bases per game (3.31).

Roster

Coaches

Players

Schedule

Awards and honors

See also
 Savannah State Tigers

References

Savannah State Tigers
Savannah State Tigers baseball seasons